Gumbrechtshoffen is a commune in the Bas-Rhin department in Grand Est in north-eastern France, approximately 18 kilometres (eleven miles) northwest of Haguenau.

On 1 September 1945 the villages of Gumbrechtshoffen-Oberbronn (Obergumbrechtshoffen in Alsatian) and Gumbrechtshoffen-Niederbronn (Niedergumbrechtshoffen) merged:  Gumbrechtshoffen was the result.

Geography
The commune is positioned between Niederbronn and Haguenau, a couple of kilometres to the west of the main road that connects the two. It is traversed by the river River Zinsel.

See also
 Communes of the Bas-Rhin department

References

Communes of Bas-Rhin
Bas-Rhin communes articles needing translation from French Wikipedia